is a Japanese manga series written and illustrated by Hideaki Sorachi. It was serialized in Shueisha's shōnen manga magazine Weekly Shōnen Jump from December 2003 to September 2018, later in Jump Giga from December 2018 to February 2019, and finished on the Gintama app, where it ran from May to June 2019. Its chapters were collected in 77 tankōbon volumes. Set in Edo, which has been conquered by aliens named Amanto, the plot follows life from the point of view of samurai Gintoki Sakata, who works as a freelancer alongside his friends Shinpachi Shimura and Kagura to pay the monthly rent. Sorachi added the science fiction setting to develop characters to his liking after his editor suggested doing a historical series.

The series has been adapted into an original video animation (OVA) by Sunrise and was featured at Jump Festa 2006 Anime Tour in 2005. This was followed by a full 367-episode anime television series, which debuted in April 2006 on TV Tokyo, and finished in October 2018. Three animated films have been produced. The first film premiered in April 2010. The second film premiered in July 2013. The third and final film premiered in January 2021. Besides the anime series, there have been various light novels and video games based on Gintama. A live-action film adaptation of the same name was released in July 2017 in Japan by Warner Bros. Pictures.

The manga has been licensed by Viz Media in North America. In addition to publishing the individual volumes of the series, Viz serialized its first chapters in their Shonen Jump manga anthology. It debuted in the January 2007 issue and was serialized at a rate of one chapter a month. Sentai Filmworks initially licensed the series. The website Crunchyroll purchased the anime's streaming rights and home video rights.

In Japan, the Gintama manga has been popular, with over 55 million copies in print, making it one of the best-selling manga series. The anime and its DVDs have been featured, at various times, in the Top Ten rankings of their respective media, while TV Tokyo has announced that the first Gintama anime was responsible for high sales overseas along with the anime adaptation from Naruto. Publications for manga, anime, and others have commented on the Gintama manga. Positive responses have focused on the comedy and characters from the series, as well as its overarching plot and action choreography.

Plot

The story is set in an alternate-history late-Edo period, where humanity is attacked by aliens called . Edo Japan's samurai fight to defend Earth, but the shōgun cowardly surrenders when he realizes the aliens' power. He agrees to an unequal contract with the aliens, placing a ban on carrying swords in public and allowing the invaders to enter the country. The samurai's swords are confiscated and the Tokugawa bakufu (shogunate) becomes a puppet government.

The series focuses on an eccentric samurai, Gintoki Sakata who works as an odd-jobs freelancer. He helps a teenager named Shinpachi Shimura save his sister Tae from an alien group that wants to send her to a brothel. Impressed by Gintoki, Shinpachi becomes his freelance apprentice to pay the bills and learn more about the enigmatic samurai.

While working, they regularly encounter the Shinsengumi police force, who often ally with Gintoki when work involves dangerous criminals. The trio also meets Gintoki's former comrades from the Amanto invasion, including the revolutionary Kotaro Katsura who is friendly toward them despite his terrorist activities against the alien-controlled government.

Although the story is mostly episodic, a few story arcs and recurring antagonists develop. For example, Gintoki's former comrade Shinsuke Takasugi is a major antagonist who regards Gintoki and his other former comrades as enemies and seeks to destroy the shogunate. Over time, Takasugi gains allies, including Kagura's brother Kamui, and the elite fighting unit Mimawarigumi to prepare for his large-scale coup d'état. After the true antagonist—the immortal Utsuro—is introduced, Gintoki works with both friends and enemies to stop Utsuro from destroying the Earth.

Themes and style
Hideaki Sorachi's main focus in Gintama is the use of gags; during the manga's second year of serialization, he started to add more drama to the story while still keeping the comedy. Various jokes from the manga are comments regarding elements from other manga series. For example, in the first chapter, after Gintoki fights a group of aliens to protect Shinpachi and Tae, Shinpachi complains that he only fought for "one page" and Gintoki replies, "Shut up! One page is a long time for a manga artist!" Gintoki's exaggerated desire to read the Weekly Shōnen Jump (which causes him to fight other readers to get it) also makes fun of shōnen series, since during those parts characters quote them. Other types of comedic situations are more general so that the reader must know about Japanese culture to understand them. The humor is described by publications as being "bizarre" and "weird". It is also described as being divided between two categories: "sci-fi comedy" and a "samurai comedy" with the former referring to the aliens. It tends to point out "an irritating foible about modern society" including celebration days or famous mythical figures. Additionally, there are references to several historical figures with a few characters from the story being based on them. Besides the series' comedy, the aliens' invasion of Japan brings several social issues between them and the humans with the most recurring one being the lack of social equality. As a result, one of the main themes involves society trying to preserve their way of living rather than fulfilling a dream like in other shōnen series.

Production

In 2003, Hideaki Sorachi was an up-and-coming manga artist who had already created two one-shots for the Weekly Shōnen Jump magazine. Although he was preparing to write his first serialized series, his editor suggested he create a manga series based on the Shinsengumi, mostly inspired by an upcoming TV drama about the 1860s troupe as depicted by idol actors. Sorachi attempted to create this series since he admitted to liking the Shinsengumi but ultimately failed to get anything off the ground. Instead of abandoning the idea completely, he remained focused on the historical Japanese era but began to create his own story, adding in elements of science fiction and fictionalizing many of the figures from the era to create a story more to his liking. The original title of the series was meant to be , but it did not have any impact on Sorachi. After a great debate, he decided to go with the name Gintama after discussing it with his family, deciding on a name that sounded close to the edge without being completely off it. Although Sorachi considered the one-shot "Samuraider" to be very poor, the setting of one-shot served as the base for Gintama such as the addition of alien characters. Sorachi liked the Bakumatsu and Sengoku periods due to how both were eras of change and thus presented the positive and negative points of humanity. The series was then set in an alternate Bakumatsu to give a bigger significance to the characters' bushido as in that time samurais were at the low point of their lives. Sorachi also cited the manga series Rurouni Kenshin (1994–1999), set during the Bakumatsu and Meiji periods, as a major source of inspiration.

The main character of the series was originally meant to be Toshiro Hijikata as Sorachi was a fan of the Shinsengumi, most notably from Hijikata Toshizō (the Shinsengumi who was the base for the one of Gintama) after he saw the film Burn! Sword!. When Sorachi could not "shake off" Hijikata's initial design, he decided not to use him as the lead character but added him along with the Shinsengumi to the story. The pilot chapter from the series had a different plot to the one from the serialization: Shinpachi already met Gintoki in the story and there were more Shinsengumi to the story such as one based on Harada Sanosuke. As all these new Shinsengumi were older than most of the recurring characters from the series, Sorachi removed them thinking they were not entertaining. When asked by a fan, Sorachi mentioned that most characters from the series are based on real-life Edo citizens while Gintoki's character is roughly based on the folk hero Sakata no Kintoki.

When starting serialization the manga was unpopular and was close to being canceled. Although Sorachi was pleased with the first tankōbon selling all of its copies, he later learned Shueisha was afraid of poor sales which resulted in the minimum printed. To increase its popularity, the author introduced new characters, the Shinsengumi, who felt memorable to his assistants. Sorachi had little hope on the manga's popularity, as he noted that people used to tell him the manga would not surpass the number of two tankōbon volumes. However, once the third volume was released, Sorachi found that he did not have "any fresh material to use." During the first year of the series, Sorachi believed that the source of the popularity of Gintama was partially connected to the Shinsengumi drama. While the drama ran during the first year of the series, when the manga was mostly shorter stories that established the characters and the world, he felt uncomfortable making things related to the drama. By the second year and beyond, he became more daring in his stories and concepts, creating longer storylines that included more drama while keeping his sense of humor and satirization of modern Japan by way of his fictionalized past.

When working on a chapter of Gintama, Sorachi sometimes had problems finishing the manuscript, leaving his supervisor to take it before he can revise it. He figured out what to write by staying in his room or going for a walk. Although he commented that some of his ideas are "random," he focused on the fact that they are all related to the manga, and when he had problems coming up with ideas, Sorachi was often helped by his editor. Thinking of Gintama as a "non-sense manga," before writing a chapter, Sorachi decided whether it should be a comedy or a drama. Sorachi defined Gintama as a "science fiction human drama pseudo-historical comedy."

When Sorachi illustrated Gintama, he usually used a felt-tip pen, a fountain pen, a brush-tip pen, and a multiliner, but for the major characters, he only used a felt-tip pen and a fountain pen and did their outlines with a multiliner-0.8.

Media

Manga

Gintama, written and illustrated by Hideaki Sorachi, started in Shueisha's shōnen manga magazine Weekly Shōnen Jump on December 8, 2003. Shueisha published the first chapters of Gintama online on their Weekly Shōnen Jump official website. In August 2018 it was announced that the manga would end on September 15 in Weekly Shōnen Jump; however, it was later announced on September 15 that the manga would be transferred to Jump Giga. It ran in three consecutive issues from December 28, 2018, to February 22, 2019. In February 2019, it was announced that the manga would continue in the free Gintama app. It started in the platform on May 13, 2019, and finished with its 704th on June 20 of the same year. Shueisha collected its chapters in 77 tankōbon volumes, released from April 2, 2004, to August 2, 2019.

Viz Media licensed Gintama for publication in North America. A 55-page preview from the series was first featured in the January 2006 Shonen Jump issue. Viz acquired the license to publish chapters from the series in the Shonen Jump during the San Diego Comic-Con International in 2006. The chapters were serialized in Shonen Jump from January to May 2007 at a rate of one chapter a month. The tankōbon volumes were published under Viz's "Shonen Jump Advanced" imprint. The first volume was published on July 3, 2007, while on August 2, 2011, Viz published the twenty-third volume. Publication of the series by Viz Media ended with that volume with no reasons given.

Jump Festa specials
Two animated specials of Gintama were developed by Sunrise for the Jump Festa Anime Tour 2005 and 2008. The first one, having the same title, is composed of various auto conclusive stories meant to introduce the characters from the series. The second special titled  is initially set in the war between aliens and samurai and it is later revealed to be a hoax. On September 30, 2009, a DVD named Gintama Jump Anime Tour 2008 & 2005 was published by Aniplex. It contains the 2005 and 2008 specials and an audio commentary. In Weekly Shōnen Jumps 34th issue of 2014, it was announced that the Gintama anime would return for a one-episode special for the year's Jump Festa. The anime special DVD was bundled with the limited edition of the 58th manga volume released on April 3, 2015. The fourth special was released in 2015.

Anime series

Gintama

An anime adaptation by Sunrise debuted on TV Tokyo on April 4, 2006. The first ninety-nine episodes were initially directed by Shinji Takamatsu. Episodes 100 to 105 were directed by Takamatsu and Yoichi Fujita, while the following episodes are being directed only by Fujita. The subtitle for the Gintama anime could be loosely translated as "The starting point is the utmost importance for anything, so trying to outdo oneself is just about right." In January 2009, Fujita mentioned he was not going to work in the fourth season of the series starting in such year. However, in February 2009, it was confirmed that the anime would continue for a fourth year, once again directed by Fujita. The series ended on March 25, 2010, with a total of 201 episodes.

In Japan, Aniplex distributes the anime in DVD format. A total of thirteen volumes were released for the first season, between July 26, 2006, and June 26, 2007. The second season was released over another set of thirteen volumes between July 25, 2007, and July 23, 2008. Season 3 was also released in thirteen volumes from August 27, 2008, to August 26, 2009. The fourth season was collected released in thirteen DVD volumes from October 28, 2009, to October 27, 2010.

In November 2008, an agreement was reached between TV Tokyo and the streaming video service Crunchyroll. Crunchyroll would stream English-subtitled episodes for free one week after they had aired in Japan. Paying subscribers can watch new episodes an hour after they air in Japan. On January 8, 2009, Crunchyroll uploaded their first episode (episode 129) to the service. Alongside new episodes each week, Crunchyroll also uploads episodes from the beginning of the series. The anime is licensed in North America by Sentai Filmworks, with distribution from Section23 Films. Section23 Films' Chris Oarr commented that only the first two seasons were licensed, with an option on the rest. The first collection containing thirteen English-subtitled episodes was released on DVD, April 27, 2010. Only 49 episodes were released before the releases stalled. However, shortly after licensing the Gintama film, Sentai Filmworks announced that based on the film's performance, they would consider releasing more of the series in North America, possibly with an English dub. An English subtitled version of the series began airing on Shorts HD on July 12, 2015. On July 1, 2016, Crunchyroll announced that they would re-release the series on Blu-ray and DVD with an English dub. On November 23, 2019, it was announced that Hulu would add an English dub for the first season to their service beginning on December 1, 2019.

Yorinuki Gintama-san
On April 5, 2010, TV Tokyo stations began airing high-definition reruns of older episodes of Gintama under the title , the title being a parody of the "best of" reruns of the anime Sazae-san. In addition to being broadcast in HD, new opening and ending animations and themes have been made. Starting with episode 10 and going to 26, the opening was changed to Joe Inoue's  and the ending was changed to Vijandeux's "WAVE". Starting with episode 27, the opening changed to Chiaki Kuriyama's  and the ending changed to Azu's "IN MY LIFE". Starting with episode 40, the opening changed to FLiP's  and the ending changed to Piko's .

====Gintama'''====

In March 2010, Yoichi Fujita hinted the anime would continue once the staff gets enough material to work on it. Shinji Takamatsu claimed the TV series "is absolutely not over. It hasn't even begun yet! It will definitely return." In December 2010, Shueisha stated that the Gintama anime would resume in April 2011. , the sequel to the original Gintama anime, premiered in Japan on April 4, 2011. The main staff from the first TV series remain in Gintama with Fujita as the director. Crunchyroll simulcasted the premiere of Gintama to subscribers from its site. The first DVD from the series was released on July 27, 2011. The episode released on September 26, 2011, contains Sket Dance as a crossover special. The series ended on March 26, 2012, with a total of 51 episodes, which were collected in thirteen DVDs by Aniplex.

Gintama': Enchōsen

The series premiered on TV Tokyo on October 4, 2012. It is a continuation of the second Gintama anime that ended in March 2012. The main staff from the second TV series remain in Gintama with Yoichi Fujita as the director. The series ended on March 28, 2013, with a total of 13 episodes The episodes were collected in a total of four DVDs from December 19, 2012, to May 22, 2013.

Gintama°

On December 21, 2014, during Jump Festa's super stage event, it was announced that a new Gintama TV series was in the works for an April 2015 premiere. The cast of Yorozuya; Tomokazu Sugita (Gintoki), Daisuke Sakaguchi (Shinpachi), and Rie Kugimiya (Kagura) attended the event. A key visual was also revealed.

The new series aired on TV Tokyo and its affiliates for 51 episodes from April 8, 2015, to March 30, 2016, which also aired the previous seasons.

Crunchyroll began streaming an English dub of the first 12 episodes of the series on February 1, 2017. 12 additional episodes were added weekly.

Gintama.

A new season of Gintama was announced via Weekly Shōnen Jump in September 2016. On November 27, 2016, it was announced that the new season would premiere on January 9, 2017, on TV Tokyo and its affiliates. The staff from the Gintama° anime series returned to reprise their roles in this season.

Gintama. Porori-hen

An anime, adapting the skipped comedic arcs taking place before the events of the Shogun Assassination Arc, began airing in October 2017. The series spanned 13 episodes and ran until December 25.

Gintama. Shirogane no Tamashii-hen

Sunrise announced that the final arc of the manga would be adapted into an anime series and began airing on January 7, 2018, spanning 12 episodes and running until March 25. In March of the same year, it was announced that the series would go on a hiatus until July. The series resumed on July 8 and ran for another 14 episodes until October 7, 2018.

Class 3Z Ginpachi-sensei
An anime adaptation of the Class 3Z Ginpachi-sensei spin-off light novel was announced at the Gintama Ato no Matsuri event on March 19, 2023.

Films
Animation

There have been three films based on the franchise. One of the TV commercials of the film teases that the "true last scene" of the anime is in the film. It premiered on April 24, 2010, picking up US$2.118.342 on 90 screens during its first days, and earned US$12.86 million in total. Sentai Filmworks released the film in both DVD and Blu-ray format in North America on May 29, 2012, as Gintama: The Motion Picture. Manga Entertainment distributed the film in the United Kingdom while Madman Entertainment published it in Australia.

A second film was announced in August 2012 by the Weekly Shonen Jump with the script being written this time by Hideaki Sorachi. It is titled Gintama: The Movie: The Final Chapter: Be Forever Yorozuya and follows Gintoki as he travels to a future where he has to deal with a mysterious group of sorcerers. It was released in Japan on July 6, 2013. Although the film is marketed as "Final" director Yoichi Fujita commented they would make a continuation if it became a hit. The film managed to surpass the success of its predecessor. 

A third film was announced in August 2019 by the manga's 77th volume. The film, titled Gintama: The Final in Japan and Gintama: The Very Final in the West, premiered on January 8, 2021. It adapts the finale of the original manga, combined with new story elements. Spyair performs the film's theme song , while Does performs an insert song. A Demon Slayer: Kimetsu no Yaiba card illustrated by Sorachi, depicting Tanjiro Kamado and the Hashira, were given to the theatergoers in the film's first week of screenings. An anime special Gintama The Semi-Final, tied into the film, premiered on January 15, 2021, on the dTV online service, with the second episode released on January 20.

Live-action

In June 2016, Shueisha announced the series would have a live-action adaptation. It premiered on July 14, 2017. The direction of the film as well as the script was handled by Yūichi Fukuda. The film stars Shun Oguri as Gintoki Sakata, along with Kanna Hashimoto as Kagura, and Masaki Suda as Shinpachi Shimura. The film follows a retelling of the franchise's successful Benizakura arc in which Kotaro Katsura is attacked by a member of the army Kiheitai, and Odd Jobs Gin starts searching for him.

A sequel to the live-action was announced in November 2017 by Director Yuichi Fukuda and Shun Oguri and was slated to release in Summer 2018. In April 2018, it was announced that Shun Oguri, Kanna Hashimoto and Masaki Suda would reprise their roles as Gintoki, Kagura, and Shinpachi respectively. The film was also given a working title of Gintama 2 (Kari) or Gintama 2 (Working title). which was eventually replaced by the final name, remaining as "Gintama 2: Okite wa Yaburu tame ni koso Aru". ("Gintama 2: Rules are Made to be Broken"). The film premiered on August 17, 2018, raising 280 million yen on its first day, selling a million tickets in just 7 days.

Along with the release of the film, a 3-episode miniseries called "Gintama 2 - Yonimo Kimyou na Gintama-chan" ("Gintama 2: The Strange and Unusual Gintama-chan") was also premiered on dTV. The 3 episodes would be revealed one per week, starting on August 18. The names of them would be 1. "I can not sleep". 2. "Hijikata quits smoking". 3. "No matter how old you are, you hate going to the dentist". In only 7 days of its release, the first episode reached 4 million views.

Original animation DVDs
The 65th and 66th volumes of the manga were bundled with an original animation DVD each, the 65th manga volume that was released on August 4, 2016, and the 66th manga volume on November 4, 2016. Both OADs adapted the Love Potion arc in the manga.

CDs
The music for the Gintama anime is composed by Audio Highs. On September 27, 2006, Audio Highs published the first CD soundtrack for the series known as Gintama Original Soundtrack. It featured 36 tracks including the TV version from the first opening theme and the first two ending themes. The second CD soundtrack, Gintama Original Soundtrack 2, was released on November 11, 2007. It included 40 tracks but it did not have TV versions of the opening and ending themes from the series. The next CD is Gintama Original Soundtrack 3 published on June 24, 2009. It features a total of 28 tracks including the theme  which was used as a gag in episode 100 from the series. The fourth and latest CD soundtrack is composed of thirty-four tracks and was released on March 21, 2013.

Each of the CDs also has an extra DVD with the original videos. The two movies have also had their original CD soundtracks.

Light novels
A series of light novels based on the Gintama manga has been authored by Tomohito Ōsaki, illustrated by Hideaki Sorachi, and published by Shueisha. They feature the series characters transposed to a school setting with Gintoki acting as their teacher. It is running in Jump Square under the title . The first novel was published on February 3, 2006. As of September 4, 2013, seven light novels have been published by Shueisha.

A novelization of the second film has also been authored by Ōsaki and was released in 2013 alongside the film.

Video games
In Japan, a PlayStation 2 Gintama game, was released on August 30, 2007, and a Wii game, was released on October 25, 2007. A game for the Nintendo DS called  was released on December 6, 2007. Gintama characters also appear in the Weekly Shōnen Jump crossover Jump Super Stars and its sequel, Jump Ultimate Stars, both for Nintendo DS. Gintoki also appears as a playable fighter in the Jump crossover fighting game J-Stars Victory VS on PlayStation 3 and PlayStation Vita, with Kagura and Sadaharu acting as support. "Gintama's Sugoroku - 銀魂のすごろく" was released on January 24, 2013, for the PlayStation Portable by Namco Bandai Games. On August 31, 2017, Bandai Namco Entertainment announced "Gintama Rumble", a hack and slash action game for the PlayStation 4 and the PlayStation Vita. On October 18, 2018, in the Japanese version and follow-up on July 22, 2020, including all other regional versions of the game, Gintama crossed over with The King of Fighters All Star, a mobile beat'em up a spinoff of The King of Fighters. In the original crossover Gintoki, Kagura, Kondo, Hijikata, Okita, and Takasuki as well as non-playable Shinpachi and Elizabeth in a few costumes such as Terry Bogard. In the second collab Katsura, White Yaksha Gintoki, Kamui, and a playable Elizabeth incorporating the costumes from the previous collab into their moveset.

Guidebooks
There have been various guidebooks for the Gintama manga and its anime. The first guidebook for the manga is  released by Shueisha on April 4, 2006. It features characters files, an interview with Hideaki Sorachi, and original character stickers. Like the previous book, this one also has an interview with Sorachi and files for the new characters that have appeared in the series since the first guidebook's release. The first guidebook for the anime is named . It was published on April 4, 2008, to celebrate the airing of the anime's 100th episode. This guidebook features commentaries by the Japanese voice actors and the cast from the series. A series of three anime character guidebooks titled  have also been published in Japan within 2010.

Reception
The Gintama manga had 50 million volumes in print as of May 2016 and over 55 million as of February 2018. In March 2007, Shueisha announced that sales of the first volume had passed one million copies. Following volumes from the manga have also had good sales, having appeared various times in the Japanese comic ranking. The 17th volume from the manga ranked as the 10th bestseller volume from Japan during 2007. During 2008, the manga ranked as the 10th bestseller series with over 2.3 million copies sold. It also hit number 5 in Japan in the most sold manga in the first half of 2009 list, selling over 2.7 million volumes from November 17, 2008, to May 17, 2009.

In 2008 Gintama was featured in two Oricon surveys; it ranked at the top as "funniest manga" and 5th in "most interesting manga". In another survey from 2009, it was listed as the sixth choice for what manga could be adapted into a live-action film. In a poll from Zassosha's Puff Japanese manga magazine, Gintama was second in the category "Best Long Stories". Fuji News Network has cited Gintama as one of the anime responsible for the wooden swords' popularity during 2008 as Hokkaido's retailers have experienced brisk sales in wooden swords to foreigners. On TV Asahi's Manga Sōsenkyo 2021 poll, in which 150.000 people voted for their top 100 manga series, Gintama ranked 12th.

In North America, Gintama has ranked as the best new shōnen manga from 2007 in About.com's 2007 Readers Poll: Best New Shonen Manga. In the Society for the Promotion of Japanese Animation Award from 2008, Gintama was nominated for the category "Best Manga - Comedy", losing to Negima! Magister Negi Magi. English sales from the manga volumes have also been good with some of them having appeared in Diamond Comic Distributors's Top 300 Graphic Novels.

The first Gintama light novel became the top-selling novel from Japan in 2006. The same achievement was made by the third novel during 2008. The anime adaptation has also been featured several times in the Japanese TV ranking, with the first two episodes having a rating of 5.6. DVD sales of the series have also been featured in the Japanese anime DVD ranking various times, while the third DVD of season 3 ranked ninth in the Japanese Amazon.com Top Ten of best sellers DVDs during 2008. In August 2008, TV Tokyo announced that Gintama and Naruto "contributed to robust sales of overseas rights in the last fiscal year which ended in March." In a poll from Puff, Gintama won in the category "Best Animation". The DVD from the Gintama OVAs became the top-selling OVA in Japan in 2009, having sold 61,226 units after two weeks of being released. In the Oricon survey "2009's Top-Selling DVDs in Japan", the same DVD ranked at the top of the category "Animation/Special Effects DVDs" with a total of 76,000 units sold. The CD soundtrack Gintama The Best received the "Animation Album of the Year award" from the Kinema Junpo's DVD Navigator Japanese magazine.

Critical response to the Gintama manga has generally been positive when it comes to gags. Carlo Santos from Anime News Network found the manga to be a "one-of-a-kind comedy" praising the characters' personalities and gags. On the other hand, the artwork was criticized for being "hard to follow" when there are fast scenes. Jokes regarding clichés from other shōnen series were also positively received by About.com writer Deb Aoki, who, like Santos, found the artwork to be "the only thing that distracts from the otherwise considerable pleasures of this loveable, goofy manga". However, characters' designs were praised for their variations including the ones from the aliens appearing in the series by Katherine Dacey from Pop Culture Shock who remarked that "These characters add visual interest and life to every panel, keeping the reader invested when the stories stall." Other negative comments regarding the manga have the few numbers of aliens appearing in the series as well as how some chapters are focused on fights such as Hijikata's fight against Gintoki. Michael Aronson from Manga Life concluded his review of the manga by saying that "The potential is there, but the execution is struggling" as still, he liked the comedy from the story. Comics Village's Alex Hoffman mentioned that Gintama "can't truly be compared to those comics because of one thing: the jokes." He found the context from the series hilarious and like how there are new jokes in every chapter. Like other reviewers, Hoffman also disliked Sorachi's artwork, but still found the manga to be "a great comedy, or a great read." Comic Book Bin writer Leroy Douresseaux found that the large number of characters with different appearances in the series allows the reader to remain entertained with the series as "at least every few pages or so present some unusual and interesting visual." Anime News Network criticized its constant amount of penis jokes as well as the narrative's style which might bother readers. The series' story arcs were also criticized for being derivative to common Shonen Jump series and that the battles were poorly illustrated and coreographed. The ending of the series was criticized as for its messy storytelling where multiple plots are explained but not all are solved as the title instead focuses on telling multiple jokes from different point of views. Anime News Network praised the ending's gags but lamented how several of the subplot of the series were not properly closed as a result of using several characters. IGN was more positive, comparing the narrative to two other popular shonen manga series Naruto and Jujutsu Kaisen for how Gintoki and his friends deal with the Shoyo and Utsuro in their final fights "distilling a major conflict into a massive good-versus-evil showdown helps it to become interesting even for those who aren't as up to date on the saga as others"- Crunchyroll felt the animation felt more a Dragon Ball film rather than Gintama as a result of Toei working on it but still praised for retaining a humor and style reminiscent of the comedy Konosuba. Yahoo panned the movie for being too difficult to follow unless the audience has knowledge about previous Gintama events and found some jokes did not feel appealing. Nevertheless, he praised fight scenes which would appeal to the fans of samurai series Rurouni Kenshin and Afro Samurai.

The anime adaptation of Gintama has received positive and mixed responses. The humor was noted to be improved after the series' introduction although some jokes were hard to understand because some of them are references to Japanese culture and other series. The notes on the DVD releases were criticized for lacking an explanation of cultural jokes. Additionally, the humor's quality was found to be inconsistent within the first episodes due to the depth some bring, to the point that some viewers may abandon the series. The quality of the series was found to improve as the series continues as people would not be intimidated by its large number of episodes. The characters' actions were praised due to their knowledge that their tendencies to "break the fourth wall", while the female characters were found appealing based on their unusual qualities. The series has been noted for its ability to shift between comedy and drama without a loss of quality.

Controversy
Episode 232 of the anime series had a defamatory depiction of a character that referenced a specific politician, then–Minister for Government Revitalisation Renhō Murata, which resulted in the cancelation of its rerun on AT-X. Series supervisor Shinji Takamatsu explained that TV Tokyo canceled the rerun on its own. Renhō's representative denied having objected to the episode although a report from the newspaper Mainichi Shimbun'' stated the affected party contacted TV Tokyo. When the story arc the episode belonged to was completed, Takamatsu expressed doubts about the arc's release in DVD format.

References

External links

  
 
  
  
 Official Warner Brothers Gintama: Shinyaku Benizakura-Hen website 
 

 
2003 manga
2006 anime television series debuts
2006 Japanese novels
2010 Japanese television series endings
2011 anime television series debuts
2012 Japanese television series endings
2013 Japanese television series endings
2015 anime television series debuts
2017 anime television series debuts
Adventure anime and manga
Anime series based on manga
Aniplex
Bandai Namco franchises
Bandai Namco Pictures
Comedy anime and manga
Funimation
Light novels
Manga adapted into films
Medialink
Samurai in anime and manga
Science fiction anime and manga
Sentai Filmworks
Shōnen manga
Shueisha manga
Shueisha franchises
Sunrise (company)
TV Tokyo original programming
Viz Media manga